Robert Milton Wolfe, Sr. (died 1940) was a Democratic mayor of South Norwalk, Connecticut from 1909 to 1910 and from 1912 to 1913. He was the last mayor of South Norwalk. The city consolidated with the city of Norwalk, in 1913. He was an original member of the board of incorporators of the city of Norwalk.

In 1925, he served as Norwalk's Acting Mayor.

In 1935, former South Norwalk mayor Albert Pohlman, broke from the local Democratic party, formed the People's Party and ran for mayor of Norwalk. Wolfe served as Pohlman's campaign manager, but Pohlman was defeated by Frank T. Stack in a four-way race.

References 

Physicians from Connecticut
Mayors of Norwalk, Connecticut
Connecticut city council members
Connecticut Democrats
1940 deaths
Year of birth missing